The Tour of Szeklerland is a European cycling stage race held in Romania. Since 2008, the race has been organised as a 2.2 event on the UCI Europe Tour.

Winners

External links

UCI Europe Tour races
Cycle races in Romania
Recurring sporting events established in 2008
2008 establishments in Romania
Summer events in Romania